The rial or riyal was the currency of North Yemen, first the Mutawakkilite Kingdom of Yemen, then the Yemen Arab Republic.

History
The Mutawakkilite Kingdom began issuing coins around the turn of the 20th century. The rial was divided into 160 zalat, 80 halala or 40 buqsha. During the reign of Imam Yahya, the first rial coins were issued. Denominations were given on coins as a fraction of the rial, with the "honorific" Imadi appearing on the coins of Imam Yahya and Ahmadi on the coins of Imam Ahmad. Consequently, the currency is sometimes referred to as the "Imadi riyal" or "Ahmadi rial".

A modern style coinage was introduced into circulation in 1963, following the establishment of the Yemen Arab Republic. The country was one of the last to adopt a decimal currency system. In 1974 the rial was divided into 100 fils, although inflation has caused the fils denominations to disappear from circulation.

After the unification of Yemen, the Yemeni rial replaced the North Yemeni rial at par.

Coins
In the reign of Imam Yahya (1904-1948), bronze coins were issued for 1 zalat, 1 halala and 1 buqsha, together with silver 1 buqsha,  and 1 rial. In the reign of his successor, Imam Ahmad (1948-1962), the silver 1 buqsha and  rial were not continued but  and  rial were introduced.

Gold coins denominated in guineas were also minted, primarily for presentation purposes.

In 1962, the Arab Republic first issued bronze  and 1 buqsha,  and  rial in a similar style to those of the last king. These were followed in 1963 by a new coinage, consisting of aluminium-bronze , 1, and 2 buqsha and silver 5, 10 and 20 buqsha and 1 rial.

In 1974, the new decimal coinage was introduced consisting of aluminium 1 fils, brass 5 and 10 fils, and cupro-nickel 25 and 50 fils. Cupro-nickel 1 rial followed in 1976.

Banknotes
In 1964, the government introduced North Yemen's first paper money, 1, 5, and 10 rial notes. These were followed by 10 and 20 buqsha in 1966, revised 1, 5, and 10 rial notes in 1969, and 20 and 50 rial notes on 13 May 1971. The Central Bank of Yemen was established on 27 July 1971, with its headquarters in Sana'a, the capital of the Arab Republic of Yemen. The Central Bank of Yemen absorbed the functions of the Yemen Currency Board. When the Arab Republic of Yemen ("North Yemen") and the Democratic Republic of Yemen ("South Yemen") united on 22 May 1990 to form the Republic of Yemen, the north's Central Bank of Yemen merged with the south's Bank of Yemen, and the joint venture continued to use the name Central Bank of Yemen.

Value

Notes

References

External links

Currencies of Asia
Modern obsolete currencies
North Yemen
Economy of Yemen
Currencies of Yemen